Claude Raymond Anderson (11 April 1924 – 28 June 2010) was an Australian rules footballer who played with South Melbourne in the Victorian Football League (VFL).

His brother, Syd Anderson played for Melbourne.

Personal life
Anderson served as a corporal in the Australian Army during the Second World War.

Notes

External links 

1924 births
2010 deaths
Australian rules footballers from Melbourne
Sydney Swans players
Australian Army personnel of World War II
Australian Army soldiers
People from Port Melbourne
Military personnel from Melbourne